Attorney General Dobson may refer to:

Alfred Dobson (Australian politician) (1849–1908), Attorney-General of Tasmania
William Lambert Dobson (1833–1898), Attorney-General of Tasmania